Eumysia fuscatella is a species of snout moth in the genus Eumysia. It was described by George Duryea Hulst in 1900. It is found in California, United States.

References

Moths described in 1900
Phycitinae